Ali Umarovich Dimayev (born 27 September 1953) is a Chechen musician and composer. In 1968 he started the first Vainakh rock ensemble in the Soviet Union with his fellow schoolmates, and after serving in the Soviet military he headed the folk instrument orchestra of state radio in the Checheno-Ingush ASSR. He has written over 500 songs, including Nokhchicho (Нохчийчоь).

Biography 
Ali was born on September 27, 1953, in the Kirghiz SSR. He was born exile after the Aardakh. His father was musician Umar Dimayev, and he was a major influence in his musical activities. In 1968, with his classmates, he organized the first Chechen national rock ensemble "Vainakhi".

Ali joined the military in Volgograd. During the service he created the stage ensemble "Warriors". The ensemble often toured with concerts in the military units of Volgograd and the North Caucasus Military District. In 1977, after demobilization, he worked as the head of the folk instruments orchestra of the State Radio and Television of the Checheno-Ingush ASSR.

In 1981 he created the professional rock group "Zama". In 2001 he was awarded the title People's Artist of the Chechen Republic. In October of the same year he was awarded the title People's Artist of the Republic of Ingushetia.

Dimayev currently lives in Moscow.

Family 

 Father - Umar Dimayev, famous Chechen musician and composer, People's Artist of the Chechen-Ingush ASSR.

References

1953 births
Chechen male singers
20th-century Russian male singers
20th-century Russian singers
21st-century Russian male singers
21st-century Russian singers
Soviet male singers
Living people